The Avenger is a 1931 American pre-Code Western film directed by Roy William Neill and starring Buck Jones and Dorothy Revier. The film is loosely based on the exploits of legendary Mexican bandit Joaquin Murrieta, who, in the mid-19th century, went to California and, according to the legend, swore vengeance against Americans and began of a series of robberies in the mining country after being discriminated against by white men.

The film was remade in 1942 as Vengeance of the West, directed by Lambert Hillyer and starring Bill Elliott and Tex Ritter.

Premise
In 1849, Joaquin Murietta (Buck Jones) is determined to track down the three men, Black Kelly (Otto Hoffman), Ike Mason (Edward Peil Sr.) and Al Goss (Walter Percival), who lynched his brother. As "The Black Shadow," he robs the rich, gives to the poor, and romances the new school teacher Helen Lake (Dorothy Revier).

Cast

References

External links
 
 
 
 

1931 films
American black-and-white films
American Western (genre) films
1931 Western (genre) films
Columbia Pictures films
Films directed by Roy William Neill
1930s English-language films
1930s American films